Gracixalus lumarius, also known as the thorny tree frog or thorny bushfrog, is a species of rhacophorid frog. It is endemic to Vietnam and only known from Mount Ngoc Linh in Ngoc Linh Nature Reserve, Kon Tum Province.

References

lumarius
Amphibians of Vietnam
Endemic fauna of Vietnam
Amphibians described in 2014
Taxa named by Jodi Rowley